Elly Maersk is one of the eight E-class container ships operated by the A.P. Moller-Maersk Group.

Hull and engine
Elly Maersk was built by the Odense Steel Shipyard in yard 208 and was completed on 23 September 2007. It is a fully cellular container ship with 23 holds, with a total carrying capacity of 15,500 TEU. Upon completion the hull was painted with an environmentally friendly silicone paint that would improve the ship's performance and lower its fuel consumption.

The vessel is powered by a Wärtsilä-Sulzer 14RTFLEX96-C diesel electric engine, capable of producing 80,905 kW (109,998 hp) driving one propeller. This two-stroke, 14-cylinder engine was built by the Doosan Engine Company in Changwan. When constructed, the vessel utilized one 8,200 kW and five 5,925 kW auxiliary generators.

Pirate attack
The Elly Maersk is considered to be an impractical target of pirate attacks, in terms of chasing and boarding vessel. On 30 December 2010, the crew of the Elly Maersk reported a suspicious vessel to the UN fleet and 6 suspected pirates were captured by the Danish warship Esbern Snare. The suspected pirates were released on 9 February 2011 due to lack of evidence and returned to the shores of Somalia.

References

External links
 Maersk Fleet
 Maersk Line

2007 ships
Ships built in Odense
Ships of the Maersk Line